Emma Woodcock (born 9 November 1976) is a Welsh international lawn and indoor bowler.

Profile
In 2016, she won a silver medal with Kathy Pearce and Anwen Butten in the triples at the 2016 World Outdoor Bowls Championship in Christchurch.

She was selected as part of the Welsh team for the 2018 Commonwealth Games on the Gold Coast in Queensland

Achievements
 Silver medal - 2016 World Outdoor Bowls Championship - Women's Triples
 2009 Welsh Rinks
 2010, 2011, 2012 Welsh Double Rink
 2014 Welsh Singles
 2015 Welsh Mixed Pairs
 2016 Welsh Champion of Champions

References

Welsh female bowls players
1976 births
Living people
Bowls players at the 2018 Commonwealth Games
Commonwealth Games competitors for Wales